Saudi Aramco, officially the Saudi Arabian Oil Group (formerly Arabian-American Oil Company) or simply Aramco, is a Saudi Arabian public petroleum and natural gas company based in Dhahran. , it is one of the largest companies in the world by revenue. It is the single greatest contributor to global carbon emissions of any company in the world since 1965.

Saudi Aramco operates the world's largest single hydrocarbon network, the Master Gas System. Saudi Aramco operates the Ghawar Field, the world's largest onshore oil field, and the Safaniya Field, the world's largest offshore oil field.

On 18 December 2019, the company's shares commenced trading on the Tadawul stock exchange. The shares rose to 35.2 Saudi riyals, giving it a market capitalisation of about US$1.88 trillion, and surpassed the US$2 trillion mark on the second day of trading. In the 2022 Forbes Global 2000, Saudi Aramco was ranked as the 3rd-largest public company in the world.

History
Saudi Aramco's origins trace to the oil shortages of World War I and the exclusion of American companies from Mesopotamia by the United Kingdom and France under the San Remo Petroleum Agreement of 1920. The US administration had popular support for an "Open Door policy", which Herbert Hoover, secretary of commerce, initiated in 1921. Standard Oil of California (SoCal) was among those US companies seeking new sources of oil from abroad.

Through its subsidiary company, the Bahrain Petroleum Co. (BAPCO), SoCal struck oil in Bahrain on May 30, 1932. This event heightened interest in the oil prospects of the Arabian mainland. On 29 May 1933, the Saudi Arabian government granted a concession to SoCal in preference to a rival bid from the Iraq Petroleum Co. The concession allowed SoCal to explore for oil in Saudi Arabia. SoCal assigned this concession to a wholly owned subsidiary, California-Arabian Standard Oil (CASOC). In 1936, with the company having had no success at locating oil, the Texas Company (Texaco) purchased a 50% stake of the concession. After four years of fruitless exploration, the first success came with the seventh drill site in Dhahran in 1938, a well referred to as Dammam No. 7. On 31 January 1944, the company name was changed from California-Arabian Standard Oil Co. to Arabian American Oil Co. (or Aramco). In 1948, Standard Oil of New Jersey (later known as Exxon) purchased 30% and Socony Vacuum (later Mobil) purchased 10% of the company, with SoCal and Texaco retaining 30% each. The newcomers were also shareholders in the Iraq Petroleum Co. and had to get the restrictions of the Red Line Agreement lifted in order to be free to enter into this arrangement.

In 1949, ARAMCO had made incursions into the Emirate of Abu Dhabi, leading to a border dispute between Abu Dhabi and Saudi Arabia.
In 1950, King Abdulaziz threatened to nationalize his country's oil facilities, thus pressuring Aramco to agree to share profits 50/50.

A similar process had taken place with American oil companies in Venezuela a few years earlier. The American government granted US Aramco member companies a tax break known as the golden gimmick equivalent to the profits given to King Abdulaziz. In the wake of the new arrangement, the company's headquarters were moved from New York to Dhahran. In 1951, the company discovered the Safaniya Oil Field, the world's largest offshore field. In 1957, the discovery of smaller connected oil fields confirmed the Ghawar Field as the world's largest onshore field.

In 1975, the Saudi Arabia second five-year economic plan included a Master Gas Plan. Natural gas would be used to generate power, rather than flaring the gas. The plan counted on using the associated gas, but by 1985, Aramco was able to include a billion standard cubic foot per day (Bscfd) of non-associated gas. In 1994, Aramco discovered more non-associated gas in the deeper Jawf sandstone formation, and built plants in Hawiyah and Haradh to process it. This increased the capacity of the Master Gas System to 9.4 billion scfd.

Yom Kippur War
In 1973, following US support for Israel during the Yom Kippur War, the Saudi Arabian government acquired a 25% "participation interest" in Aramco's assets. It increased its participation interest to 60% in 1974 and acquired the remaining 40% interest in 1976. Aramco continued to operate and manage the former Aramco assets, including its concessionary interest in certain Saudi Arab oil fields, on behalf of the Saudi Arab Government until 1988. In November 1988, a royal decree created a new Saudi Arab company, the Saudi Arabian Oil Company, to take control of the former Aramco assets (or Saudi Aramco) and took the management and operations control of Saudi Arabia's oil and gas fields from Aramco and its partners.

Persian Gulf War
In September 1990, after the start of the Persian Gulf War, Aramco was expected to replace much of the oil production removed from the global market due to the embargo of Iraq and occupied Kuwait. This amounted to producing an extra 4.8 million barrels per day (Mbpd) to keep the global oil market stable. In addition, Aramco was expected to provide all of the coalition aviation and diesel needs. Aramco recommissioned 146 Harmaliyah, Khurais, and Ghawar oil wells with associated gas oil separation plants, and saltwater treatment pipeline, that had been mothballed during the 1980s oil price collapse. Daily production increased from 5.4 Mbpd in July to 8.5 Mbpd in December 1990 after a three-month de-mothball effort.

Starting in 1990, Aramco embarked on an expansion of crude oil sales in the Asian market. Agreements with South Korea, the Philippines, and China resulted. By 2016, about 70% of Aramco's crude oil sales were to Asia.

2000s
In May 2001, Saudi Arabia announced the Gas Initiative, which proposed forming three joint ventures with eight IOCs for gas exploration on pure upstream acreage. Core Venture 1 included south Ghawar and north Rub' Al-Khali, Core Venture 2 included the Red Sea, while Core Venture 3 involved Shaybah and Kidan. In 2003, Royal Dutch Shell and TotalEnergies formed a partnership with Saudi Aramco in Core Venture 3. In 2004, Core Venture 1 became three separate joint ventures with Saudi Aramco holding 20%, one with Lukoil, a second with Sinopec, and a third with Repsol.

By 2004, Aramco was producing 8.6 million barrels per day (mbpd) out of a potential 10 mbpd. In 2005, Aramco launched a five-year plan to spend US$50 billion to increase their daily capacity to 12.5 mbpd by increasing production and refining capacity and doubling the number of drilling rigs.

In 2005, Saudi Aramco was the world's largest company with an estimated market value of US$781 billion.

In June 2008, in response to crude oil prices exceeding US$130 a barrel, Aramco announced it would increase production to 9.7 million barrels per day (mbpd). Then as prices plummeted, Aramco stated in January 2009, that it would reduce production to 7.7 mbpd.

In 2011, Saudi Aramco started production from the Karan Gas Field, with an output of more than 400 million scf per day.

In January 2016, the Deputy Crown Prince of Saudi Arabia, Mohammad bin Salman Al Saud, announced he was considering listing shares of the state-owned company, and selling around 5% of them in order to build a large sovereign wealth fund.

On 26 April 2017, Saudi security forces thwarted an attempted attack on an Aramco oil distribution center involving an unmanned boat from Yemen.

The Wall Street Journal reported in September 2018, Aramco was considering a US$1 billion venture-capital fund to invest in international technology firms.

In June 2019, a report by Financial Times claimed that Aramco had been bearing the ministry-related expenses; boosting the finance ministry budget allocation. It also included Energy Minister Khalid Al Falih’s company-related and diplomatic trips, as well as his stays in luxurious hotels. However, an ally mentioned that Falih’s policies have delivered additional oil revenues that far exceeded his expenses.

In September 2019, Saudi Arabia appointed Yasir Al-Rumayyan as the Chairman of Aramco. Al-Rumayyan became head of the country’s sovereign wealth fund by replacing Khalid Al-Falih, who was holding the position since 2015.

2012 cyber attack
Aramco computers were attacked by a virus on 15 August 2012. The following day Aramco announced that none of the infected computers were part of the network directly tied to oil production, and that the company would soon resume full operations. Hackers claimed responsibility for the spread of the computer virus. The virus hit companies within the oil and energy sectors. A group named "Cutting Sword of Justice" claimed responsibility for an attack on 30,000 Saudi Aramco workstations, causing the company to spend months restoring their services. The group later indicated that the Shamoon virus had been used in the attack. Due to this attack, the main site of Aramco went down and a message came to the home page apologizing to customers. Computer security specialists said that "The attack, known as Shamoon, is said to have hit "at least one organization" in the sector. Shamoon is capable of wiping files and rendering several computers on a network unusable." Richard Clarke suggests the attack was part of Iran's retaliation for the US involvement in Stuxnet. Security researcher Chris Kubecka, who helped the company establish security after the attack, detailed the level of sophistication in her Black Hat USA 2015 presentation and episode 30 of Darknet Diaries.

2019 drone attack 

On 14 September 2019, there was a drone attack on two Saudi Aramco plants: the Abqaiq oil processing facility and Khurais oil field. Houthi rebels claimed responsibility for the attack. The attack cut 5.7 million barrels per day (bpd) of Saudi crude output, over 5% of the world's supply. There were discussions by Saudi Arabian officials on postponing Aramco's IPO, because the attacks "sidelined more than half of the kingdom's output" of oil.

2019 Initial public offering (IPO) 
Since around 2018, Saudi Arabia had been considering to put a portion of Saudi Aramco's ownership, up to 5%, onto public trading via a staged initial public offering (IPO), as to reduce the cost to the government of running the company. While the IPO had been vetted by major banks, the IPO was delayed over concerns of Aramco's corporate structure through 2018 into 2019. The September 2019 drone attacks on Aramco's facilities also delayed the onset of the IPO.

On 9 April 2019, Aramco issued bonds collectively valued at US$12 billion. Its first international bond issue received more than US$100 billion in orders from foreign investors, which breaks all records for a bond issue by an emerging market entity.

Aramco announced on Sunday 3 November 2019 its plan to list 1.5% of its value as an IPO on the Tadawul stock exchange.

On 9 November 2019, Saudi Aramco released a 600-page prospectus giving details of the IPO. According to the specifications provided, up to 0.5% of the shares were locked for individual retail investors.

On 4 December 2019, Saudi Aramco priced its offering at 32 Saudi riyals (approximately US$8.53 at the time) per share. The company generated subscriptions of total amount equals US$119 billion representing 456% of total offer shares. It raised US$25.6 billion in its IPO, making it the world's largest IPO, succeeding that of the Alibaba Group in 2014. The company commenced trading on Tadawul on 11 December 2019, with shares rising 10% to 35.2 riyals, giving the company a market capitalisation of about U$1.88 trillion, and making Saudi Aramco the world's largest listed company.

Global Medium Term Note Programme

According to a bourse filing made by Aramco, the like of Goldman Sachs, HSBC, Morgan Stanley, JPMorgan, and NCB Capital were hired by the company for organizing investor calls prior to the planned transaction. The document published by one of the other banks said to be involved in the deal showed that the deal included BNP Paribas, MUFG, BofA Securities, SMBC Nikko, First Abu Dhabi Bank, Societe Generale, and BOC International. The company has reported a fall in the net profit of its third-quarter for November 2020, due to increased crude prices and a drop in its demand following the COVID-19 pandemic.

2020s 
On 10 March 2020 Saudi Aramco announced a global partnership with Formula One landing a multi year deal.

On 17 June 2020, Saudi Aramco acquired a 70% share in SABIC, a chemicals manufacturing company.

In June 2020, Saudi Aramco laid off nearly 500 of its more than 70,000 employees, as global energy firms reduced their workforce due to the COVID-19 pandemic. Most of the workers who lost their job at Aramco were foreigners.

On 31 July 2020, Saudi Aramco lost its title as the world’s largest listed company by market capitalization to Apple.

On 9 August 2020, Saudi Aramco reported a 50% fall in net income for the first half of its financial year, as demand for oil and prices continued to fall due to the coronavirus crisis.

On 3 November 2020, Saudi Aramco reported a 44.6% drop in third-quarter net profit amid the COVID-19 pandemic.

On 14 December 2020, Saudi state TV announced that an oil tanker carrying over 60,000 metric tons of unleaded gasoline from an Aramco refinery at Yanbu, had been attacked by a smaller boat rigged with explosives.

In March 2021, Saudi Aramco announced that earnings in 2020 fell by nearly 45% compared with 2019, as lockdowns around the world following the COVID-19 pandemic curbed demand for oil.

On 19 March 2021, an Aramco refinery was attacked by six bomb-laden drones. The attack, which was claimed by Houthi rebels, started a fire but caused no injuries or damage, according to the official Saudi Press Agency.

On 21 March 2021, Saudi Aramco signed an agreement to secure China's energy supplies for the next 50 years, and also to develop new technologies to combat climate change. More recently, they signed a deal with a consortium led by EIG.

In July 2021, Saudi Aramco appointed former HSBC Holdings Plc Chief Executive Officer Stuart Gulliver to the company's board of directors.

In October 2021, Saudi Aramco announced plans to achieve net-zero carbon emissions from its wholly-owned operations by 2050.

On 20 November 2021, Houthi fighters took credit for launching 14 drones at military targets in Riyadh, Abha, Jizan, Najran, and Jeddah, and Aramco's refineries in Jeddah.

In 2021, The Guardian reported that Aramco was not trying to diversify at the same rate as other oil companies, such as Shell and BP. Rather, Aramco announced in 2021 that the company intended to increase crude capacity from 12m barrels a day to 13m barrels by 2027.

In February 2022, following crude's ascent to nearly $95 per barrel, Saudi Arabia's Aramco boosted oil prices for clients in Asia, the United States, and Europe.

In March 2022, Houthi fighters attacked an Aramco storage site in Jeddah causing a fire in two storage tanks. The incident occurred during qualifying for the 2022 Saudi Arabian Grand Prix.

On 11 May 2022, Saudi Aramco became the largest (most valuable) company in the world by market cap, surpassing Apple Inc.

In August 2022, Saudi Aramco announced that it would acquire Valvoline's petroleum unit for $2.65 billion.

In March 2023, Saudi Aramco announced that they had seen record profits of $161 billion as prices of petrol soared following the Corona-virus pandemic. The figures eclipsed the numbers posted by ExxonMobil and Shell, who reported $55.7 and $39.9 billion in profit respectively.

Operation

Saudi Aramco is headquartered in Dhahran, but its operations span the globe and include exploration, production, refining, chemicals, distribution and marketing. All these activities of the company are monitored by the Saudi Arabian Ministry of Petroleum and Mineral Resources together with the Supreme Council for Petroleum and Minerals. However, the ministry has much more responsibility in this regard than the council.

Board of directors
 Yasir Othman Al-Rumayyan (chairman), member of the Council of Economic and Development Affairs (Saudi Arabia)
 Ibrahim Abdulaziz Al-Assaf, former Minister of Foreign Affairs and Minister of Finance
 Mohammed Al-Jadaan, current Minister of Finance
 Mohammad M. Al-Tuwaijri, former Minister of Economy and Planning
 Nabil Al-Amoudi, former Minister of Transport
 Mark Moody-Stuart, former chairman of Anglo American, HSBC, and the Foundation for the United Nations Global Compact
 Andrew N. Liveris, former chairman and CEO of Dow Chemical
 Lynn Elsenhans, former chairwoman and CEO of Sunoco
 Peter Cella, former president and CEO of Chevron Philips Chemical
 Mark Weinberger, former chairman and CEO of Ernst & Young
 Amin H. Nasser, president and CEO of Saudi Aramco

Exploration
A significant portion of the Saudi Aramco workforce consists of geophysicists and geologists. Saudi Aramco has been exploring for oil and gas reservoirs since 1982. Most of this process takes place at the EXPEC Advanced Research Center. Originally, Saudi Aramco used Cray Supercomputers (CRAY-1M) in its EXPEC Advanced Research Center (ECC) to assist in processing the colossal quantity of data obtained during exploration and in 2001, ECC decided to use Linux clusters as a replacement for the decommissioned Cray systems. ECC installed a new supercomputing system in late 2009 with a disk storage capacity of 1,050 terabytes (i.e, exceeding one petabyte), the largest storage installation in Saudi Aramco's history to support its exploration in the frontier areas and the Red Sea.

Refining and chemicals
While the company did not originally plan on refining oil, the Saudi government wished to have only one company dealing with oil production. Therefore, on 1 July 1993, the government issued a royal decree merging Saudi Aramco with Samarec, the country's oil refining company. The following year, a Saudi Aramco subsidiary acquired a 40% equity interest in Petron Corporation, the largest crude oil refiner and marketer in the Philippines. Since then, Saudi Aramco has taken on the responsibility of refining oil and distributing it in the country. In 2008, Saudi Aramco sold its entire stake to the Ashmore Group, a London-listed investment group. Ashmore acquired an additional 11% when it made a required tender offer to other shareholders. By July 2008, Ashmore, through its SEA Refinery Holdings B.V., had a 50.57% of Petron's stock. Ashmore's payment was made in December 2008. In December 2008, Ashmore acquired PNOC's 40% stake. In the same month, San Miguel Corporation (SMC) said it was in the final stages of negotiations with the Ashmore Group to buy up to 50.1% of Petron. In 2010, SMC acquired majority control of Petron Corporation.

Saudi Aramco's downstream operations are shifting emphasis to integrate refineries with petrochemical facilities. Their first venture into it is with Petro Rabigh, which is a joint venture with Sumitomo Chemical Co. that began in 2005 on the coast of the Red Sea. In order to become a global leader in chemicals, Aramco will acquire 50% of Royal Dutch Shell's stake in their refiner in Saudi Arabia for US$631 million.

List of refineries
List of domestic refineries:
 Jazan Refinery and terminal projects (JRTP), Jazan construction is ongoing.
 Jeddah Refinery Jeddah converted to product storage terminal in November 2017. 
 Ras Tanura Refinery (includes a Crude Distillation Unit, a Gas Condensate Unit, a hydrocracker, and catalytic reforming) 
 The Saudi Aramco Jubail Refinery Co. (SASREF), Jubail
 Riyadh Refinery
 Yanbu Refinery

List of domestic refining ventures:
 The Saudi Aramco Mobil Refinery Co. Ltd. (SAMREF), Yanbu
 Petro Rabigh, Rabigh
 Saudi Aramco Base Oil Co. (Luberef)
 Saudi Aramco Total Refining and Petrochemical Co. (SATORP), Jubail
 Yanbu Aramco Sinopec Refinery (YASREF), Yanbu

List of international refining ventures:
 Fujian Refining and Petrochemical Co. (FRPC), People's Republic of China 
 Sinopec SenMei (Fujian) Petroleum Co. Ltd. (SSPC), People's Republic of China 
 Motiva Enterprises LLC, United States, Port Arthur Texas 
 Showa Shell, Japan 
 S-Oil, Republic of Korea 
 Saudi Refining Inc., United States
 Reliance Industries, (no investment) India

Saudi Aramco at one point had been exploring projects in Pakistan, including a $10 billion refinery project in Gwandar which has since been cancelled. In 2022 it was revealed that Saudi Aramco was creating a joint venture with North Huajin Chemical Industries group to create a new company called Huajin Aramco Petrochemical Company which would develop a 300,000 bpd refining facility with ethylene steam cracking capabilities.

Shipping
Saudi Aramco has employed several tankers to ship crude oil, refined oil, and natural gas to various countries. It used to have its own created subsidiary company, Vela International Marine, which was merged with Bahri company, to handle shipping to North America, Europe, and Asia. It is a stakeholder in the King Salman Global Maritime Industries Complex, a shipyard that will be the largest in the world when complete.

Global investment 
Saudi Aramco expanded its presence worldwide to include the three major global energy markets of Asia, Europe, and North America. In April 2019, Aramco has signed a deal to acquire a 13% stake in South Korean oil refiner Hyundai Oilbank for US$1.24 billion. Moreover, on 11 April 2019, Aramco signed an agreement with Poland’s leading oil refiner PKN Orlen to supply it with Arabian Crude Oil.

Liquefied natural gas 
Aramco is planning to be a major producer of liquefied natural gas (LNG) in the world. It sold its first cargo of LNG from Singapore to an Indian buyer. The company is looking globally for potential joint ventures and partnerships to achieve its goal regarding LNG market.

Saudization
The original concession agreement included Article 23; as Ali Al-Naimi pointed out, this was a "key building block in the shaping of Saudi society for decades to come." It reads, "The enterprise under this contract shall be directed and supervised by Americans who shall employ Saudi nationals as far as practicable, and in so far as the company can find suitable Saudi employees it will not employ other nationals." The first company school was started in May 1940 in the Al-Khobar home of Hijji bin Jassim, company interpreter, translator and first instructor. Al-Naimi pointed out, "From the beginning, the development of Aramco was directly tied to the betterment of Saudi Arabia." Another school was located in Dhahran in 1941, and was called the Jebel School. Boys hired into entry-level positions attended at 7 AM for four hours, followed by four hours of work in the afternoon. In 1950, Aramco built schools for 2,400 students. In 1959, Aramco sent the first group of Saudi students to college in the States. In 1970, Aramco started hiring its first high school graduates, and in 1979 started offering college scholarships. In 1965, Zafer H. Husseini was named the first Saudi manager and in 1974, Faisal Al-Bassam was named the first Saudi vice president. One of the early students was Al-Naimi, who was named the first Saudi president of Aramco in November 1983. As Al-Naimi states, "The oil company committed itself to developing qualified Saudis to become fully educated and trained industry professionals." Al-Naimi acknowledged Thomas Barger's championing of Saudization, "You, of all of Aramco's leaders, had the greatest vision when you supported the training effort of Saudi Arab employees during its early days. That visionary support and effort is bearing fruit now and many executive positions are filled by Saudis because of that effort." In 1943, 1,600 Saudis were employed at Aramco, but by 1987, nearly two-thirds of Aramco's 43,500 strong workforce were Saudis. In 1988, Al-Naimi became CEO and Hisham Nazer became chairman, the first Saudis to hold those positions. The "pinnacle of Saudization" occurred when the Shaybah oil field came on line in July 1998, after a three-year effort by a team consisting of 90% Saudis. The Aramco of 2016 still maintained an expatriate workforce of about 15%, so Aramco can, in the words of Al-Naimi, "be sure it is getting access to the latest innovations and technical expertise."

Saudi Aramco has emitted 59.26 billion tonnes of carbon dioxide equivalent since it began operations, accounting for 4.38% of worldwide anthropogenic  emissions since 1965.

In a letter sent to nine international banks reportedly hired by Aramco to assist it in arranging its US$2 trillion market debut, ten environmental groups warned about the listing causing a highly possible hindrance in the effort to reduce greenhouse gas emissions and end human rights abuses committed by the Saudi regime.

On 6 November 2019, Saudi Aramco joined the World Bank's initiative to reduce gas flaring to zero by 2030. The firm reported flaring of less than 1% of its total raw gas production in the first half of 2019.

Controversies

2007 Haradh gas pipeline explosion 

On 18 November 2007, reports came out that a natural gas pipeline explosion had taken the lives of several workers, the death toll was later determined to be 34. Aramco asserts it was a purely maintenance-related incident.

Organizational culture 
On 9 December 2020, the Financial Times published an article about an engineer, whose family claims that Saudi Aramco was negligent in handling his Covid-19 infection. According to his family, he had been asking the company and authorities for help, three weeks before his death, but was simply asked to keep his gloves and mask on. Saudi Aramco did not formally contact his family until approximately 14 hours after his death, refused to release his body, and allegedly erased information from his mobile phone. His grieving family had to do without financial support for almost five months, and only received $400,000 in benefits, back pay and insurance after the Financial Times had started asking questions.

In the same article, five whistleblowers accuse Aramco of bullying and mismanagement. One former employee expressed his concerns about the company’s highly dangerous failure to pressure-test valves and mains units, detailing cracks in the refinery structure and sinking of roads and foundations. The refinery runs a real risk of becoming Aramco's Piper Alpha, said another expatriate employee, who also accuses Aramco of lacking a culture of challenge, facilitating ineptitude and laziness.

Treatment of workers 
In March 2020, Saudi Aramco came under fire after photos of a migrant worker dressed as a large hand-sanitizer dispenser went viral on social media. People on Twitter condemned the act as "modern-day slavery," "humiliating" and "dehumanizing." According to the company, the display was organized without the approval of Aramco officials.

Strong-arming investors 
In 2019, sources told the Financial Times that wealthy families of Saudi Arabia had been coerced into joining the Saudi Aramco IPO. According to analysts, Aramco could realistically reach a market capitalization of $1 to $1.5 trillion but the Saudis wanted $2 trillion. Oddly, many of those who signed up have relatives that were part of the 2017–2019 Saudi Arabian purge. According to four sources, the Saudi government "strong-armed", "coerced" or "bullied" some of the wealthiest families in the kingdom into becoming cornerstone investors.

Human rights 

Saudi Aramco's majority shareholder is the government of Saudi Arabia, where human rights are a matter of concern. Saudi Arabia abstained from the United Nations vote adopting the Universal Declaration of Human Rights, saying it contradicted sharia law. The country holds a reservation to the Convention on the Rights of the Child against any provisions that are in conflict with sharia law. The government has been accused of routinely using torture and of violently oppressing critics, women, along with other social groups.

Lobbying and research projects 

Saudi Aramco has funded almost 500 studies in last five years on energy issues and collaborated with the United States Department of Energy on projects to boost oil production, such as developing more efficient gasoline, enhanced oil recovery and methods to increase the flow of oil from wells. Since 2016, Saudi Arabia has spent around $140 million on lobbying to influence public opinion and policies in the US. In an effort to keep gasoline cars competitive, Saudi Aramco is working on a device which would trap some of the carbon dioxide upon attaching it to cars running on gasoline. Saudi Aramco has partnered with Hyundai to develop a fuel for gas-electric vehicles which will run on petroleum.

See also 

 Ghawar
 Max Steineke
 Shamoon
 List of oil fields: All of those located in Saudi Arabia are owned by Saudi Aramco.
 Abqaiq
 Aramco Financial Services Company
 Aramco Training Services Company
 Golden gimmick
 Thomas Barger
 Discovery! The Search for Arabian Oil
 Saudi Aramco Residential Camp in Dhahran
 List of largest companies of Saudi Arabia
 List of corporations by market capitalization
 Shaybah
 Ras Tanura
 Yanbu
 Udhailiyah
 Hui-Hai Liu

References

Bibliography

External links

 Web site of Aramco Services Co. - Saudi Aramco's US Subsidiary
 A CNN report about the security of oil in Saudi Arabia. Much of it is about Saudi Aramco security.
 Saudi Arabia's crude oil production chart (1980-2004) - Data sourced from the US Department of Energy
 CBS 60 Minutes (2008-12-07) "The Oil Kingdom: Part One".
 CBS 60 Minutes (2008-12-07) "The Oil Kingdom: Part Two".

 
Oil and gas companies of Saudi Arabia
Companies listed on Tadawul
Oil pipeline companies
National oil and gas companies
Government-owned companies of Saudi Arabia
Energy companies established in 1933
Energy companies established in 1988
Non-renewable resource companies established in 1933
Non-renewable resource companies established in 1988
1933 establishments in Saudi Arabia
Saudi Arabian companies established in 1988
Dhahran
Economic history of Saudi Arabia
History of Saudi Arabia
Saudi Arabian brands
Saudi Arabia–United States relations
2019 initial public offerings
Multinational companies headquartered in Saudi Arabia